Rosary-based prayers are Christian prayers said on a set of rosary beads, among other cords. These prayers recite specific word sequences on different parts of the rosary beads. They may be directed to Jesus Christ, the Virgin Mary or God the Father.

Holy Rosary

The best known example of a rosary-based prayer is simply called the "Holy Rosary" and involves contemplation on five rosary mysteries, while Our Father, Hail Mary and Glory be to the Father prayers are recited.

This rosary prayer goes back several centuries and there are differing views among experts on its exact history. In the sixteenth century, Pope Pius V established the current form of the original fifteen mysteries for this rosary and they remained so until the 20th century. Pope John Paul II extended the number of mysteries in this rosary during his reign, while keeping the original mysteries intact.

Further prayers specified in the Roman Catholic tradition include: the Fátima prayers, the Litany of the Blessed Virgin Mary and the Memorare of Bernard of Clairvaux.

Paternoster beads 

In monastic houses, monks were expected to pray the Divine Office daily in Latin, the liturgical language of the Western Christian Church. Christian monastics, in addition to clergymen, "recited or chanted the 150 Psalms as a major source of hourly worship." To count these repetitions, they used beads strung upon a cord and this set of prayer beads became commonly known as a pater noster, which is the Latin for "Our Father."

In some houses, lay brothers who did not understand Latin or who were illiterate were required to say the Lord's Prayer (also referred to the "Our Father") a certain number of times each day while meditating on the Mysteries of the Incarnation of Christ. Lay people adopted this practice as a form of popular worship. In the eighth century the penitentials, or rule books pertaining to penitents, prescribed various penances of twenty, fifty, or more, paters. The strings of beads, with the aid of which such penances were accurately said, gradually came to be known as paternosters. The Paternoster could be of various lengths, but was often made up of 5 "decades" of 10 beads, which when performed three times made up 150 prayers. 

Today, some Anglican religious orders, such as the Solitaries of DeKoven, make and promulgate the Pater Noster Cord, in addition to other devotions such as the Anglican Rosary, as a part of Christian spiritual life.

Servite Rosary 

In 1233, seven of the members of a Florentine Confraternity devoted to the Holy Mother of God were gathered in prayer under the presidency of Alessio Falconieri. According to tradition, the Virgin Mary appeared to the young men and exhorted them to devote themselves to her service, in retirement from the world. They retired to the deserted slopes of Monte Senario near Florence, where they experienced another vision of Mary. There they formed a new Order called the Servants of Mary, or Servites, in recognition of their special manner of venerating Our Lady of Sorrows. The seven-"week" Servite Rosary is variously called the Servite Chaplet; Rosary of the Seven Dolors of the Blessed Virgin Mary; and the Seven Swords Rosary. A set of introductory prayers for the Servite Rosary was written by Alphonsus Liguori in his book The Glories of Mary.

Franciscan Crown 

In 1263, Bonaventure, Minister General of the Order, encouraged liturgical devotion honoring the mystery of the Visitation. The Franciscan rosary, or as it is properly called, the Franciscan Crown, developed in early part of the 15th century, and was officially established in 1422. The Franciscan Crown consists of seven decades of Hail Marys, each preceded by an Our Father and followed by a Glory Be, and completed by two more Hail Marys after the 7th decade to complete the number 72 which is thought to be the age of Mary at the time of her Assumption. The Crown recalls the seven joys of Mary and how she responded to the grace of God in her life. In addition to developing this Marian devotion, the Franciscans are credited with adding the final words to the Hail Mary: Jesus. Holy Mary, Mother of God, pray for us sinners (from the writings of Bernardino of Siena) now and at the hour of our death (from the writings of the Servite Fathers and the Roman Breviary).

St. Anthony's Rosary 
The Irish (specifically the Gaelic-speaking) and their descendants have a tradition of saying thirteen Aves rather than ten, in honour of Anthony of Padua, whose feast day is 13 June. Also called the St. Anthony Chaplet, its prayers are accompanied by a poem called the Miraculous Responsory or si quaeris, written by Bonaventure.

Chaplet of the Immaculate Heart of Mary
The Rosary of Mary's Immaculate Heart is said with an ordinary rosary.

Rosary of the Holy Wounds

The Rosary of the Holy Wounds was introduced at the beginning of the 20th century by Mary Martha Chambon, a lay Roman Catholic sister of the Monastery of the Visitation Order in Chambéry, France.

This rosary specifically meditates on the wounds of Jesus Christ as an Act of Reparation for the sins of the world. This rosary also focuses on prayers for souls in purgatory. Mary Martha attributed the following purpose for the rosary to Jesus: "you must not forget ... the souls in Purgatory, as there are but few who think of their relief . . . The Holy Wounds are the treasure of treasures for the souls in Purgatory."

Chaplet of the Divine Mercy

The Chaplet of the Divine Mercy was introduced in the early 1930s by Faustina Kowalska, a nun who lived in Płock, Poland. The focus of this prayer is God's mercy and centered on three themes: to obtain mercy, to trust in Christ's mercy, and to show mercy to others.

Bridgettine Crown
The rosary as prayed by the Bridgettine order is a loop containing six decades, together with a short string of beads leading to the crucifix. It was propagated by Bridget of Sweden. It adds one additional mystery (joyful, sorrowful, and glorious) pertaining to the Blessed Virgin. It is the traditional habit rosary for the Discalced Carmelites. An example of the Bridgettine rosary may be seen depicted on the statue of the Crowned Virgin in the Sanctuary of Our Lady of Lourdes.

Trinitarian Rosary 
This term is used for at least two different rosaries or chaplets.

Trisagion rosary of the Trinitarian Order 
First, it can refer to the special rosary or chaplet used by the Trinitarian Order (the Order of the Most Holy Trinity for the Redemption of Captives), which was founded in France in 1198. From an early date, the Trinitarians have used a form of prayer based on the Trisagion (sometimes Trisagium or Triagion, from the Greek "thrice" + "holy"). This is a Byzantine prayer in praise of the Trinity: its simplest form is "Holy God, Holy Strong One, Holy Immortal One, have mercy on us."

The Trisagion rosary (usually called a chaplet) has three groups of nine beads. In reciting the chaplet, each group is preceded by the Trisagion and the Pater Noster.  A special prayer is said on each of the nine beads: "To you be praise, glory, and thanksgiving for ever, blessed Trinity. Holy, Holy, Holy, Lord God of power and might; heaven and earth are full of your glory."  Each group of nine prayers is followed by a Gloria Patri ("Glory be to the Father, and the Son, and the Holy Spirit..."), and the whole ends with a closing prayer.

As with other rosaries that are special to a particular religious Order, its history is rather cloudy. The first question is how long the Trinitarians have used the Trisagion and its associated prayers. The prayers themselves are quite old, and may well have come to the Trinitarians from Byzantium through their connections in the Middle East. The Trisagion itself can be traced at least as far back as the Council of Chalcedon (451 AD) and perhaps further. The use of these particular prayers by the Trinitarians may very well date back to the beginnings of the Order.

A separate question is when beads began to be used to count these prayers. Reciting a certain number of prayers does not necessarily imply the presence of beads—prayers can be counted on one's fingers, by moving a peg from one hole to another, and so forth. It is possible that Trisagion beads were first seen in the 14th or 15th century—when other rosaries became popular, suggesting the concept of using beads as counters.

Other Trinitarian rosaries 
Secondly, the term "Trinitarian rosary" can refer to any set of Christian prayer beads on which prayers to the Holy Trinity (Father, Son and Holy Spirit) are said.

A trinitarian rosary of this type can comprise the same basic form as the traditional Marian rosary with 5 decades of 10 beads and introductory prayers, et cetera. Or such prayers may be said with the Anglican or other variants of the beads.

There are several of these trinitarian rosaries, all of relatively recent origin. One, for instance, uses the prayer: "Almighty God, Almighty God, Heavenly King, You are the Lord! Blessed art thou in heaven, and blessed is thy sacred word! Holy Jesus, eternally begotten son of God, send your Holy Spirit upon us and kindle in our hearts the fire of your divine love!".

Ecumenical Miracle Rosary 
The Ecumenical Miracle Rosary is prayed on the Roman Catholic rosary and is based upon the miracles of Jesus. The Ecumenical Miracle Rosary has gained a favourable response from Catholic, Protestant, and Orthodox Christians and is prayed by members of these denominations. The main features of the Ecumenical Rosary include praying the Nicene Creed on the crucifix or cross, praying a prayer known as "The Greatest Commandment" on "the three Hail Mary beads and all of the decades beads," and praying a prayer known as "The Great Commission"; when returning "to the medal at the end of the rosary," the Jesus Prayer is prayed.

Chotki
While use of the Roman Catholic rosary has gradually been adopted by many Eastern Catholics, many Eastern Catholic churches have undertaken a campaign of liturgical de-Latinization, removing imported devotions and practices (such as the rosary) that have obscured and replaced traditional and authentic devotions and practices of the Eastern Catholic Churches. Subsequently, the most common prayer used in the Eastern Christian Churches (Eastern Orthodox and Eastern Catholic) is the Jesus Prayer, which makes use of the more ancient prayer rope (chotki), a knotted rope (rather than beads) joined together with a knotted cross. The prayer rope is not as fixed in form as the Western rosary (it may have 10, 33, 50, 100, or 500 knots on it), and it normally makes use of beads only as dividers between sections. The Eastern prayer rope is often divided into decades, but it may also be divided into sections of 25 or some other number, or not divided at all.

Anglican Rosary

Among High Church Anglicans,  Anglican prayer beads are sometimes used. This set is also known as the "Anglican Rosary" or as "Christian prayer beads", the latter term arising from the popularity this set has gained among Christians of various other traditions. Anglican bead sets contain 28 beads in groups of seven called "weeks", with an additional large bead before each. In total, there are 33 beads representing the years of Jesus' life on Earth. A number of Anglicans use the Jesus Prayer, just like Eastern Christians, but there are no church-appointed prayers or meditations in the Anglican practice. Some Anglo-Catholics use the traditional Dominican rosary.

See also
 Prayer to Saint Joseph
 Chaplet (prayer)
 Prayer beads
 Wreath of Christ, "Lutheran rosary"

Notes

References
Anne Cecil Kerr, 1937, Sister Mary Martha Chambon of the Visitation B. Herder Publishing.
Mary Faustina Kowalska, 2003, Diary: Divine Mercy in My Soul Marian Press, 
 Ball, Ann. 2003 Encyclopedia of Catholic Devotions and Practices 

Rosary
Roman Catholic prayers
Prayer beads